Nicolae Diță (born 11 October 1976) is a Romanian former football defender.

Honours
Argeș Pitești
Divizia B: 1993–94

References

1976 births
Living people
Romanian footballers
Association football defenders
Liga I players
Liga II players
FC Argeș Pitești players
FC Dacia Pitești players
CS Mioveni players
CS Otopeni players
ASC Daco-Getica București players
SCM Râmnicu Vâlcea players
Sportspeople from Pitești